Brunell is a surname of French origin meaning "brown (haired / skinned) one" same as Burnell (metathesis). Notable people with the surname include:

Angel Brunell (born 1945), former Uruguayan footballer
Beatriz Stix-Brunell (born 1993), ballet dancer
Caitlin Brunell (born 1992), won the Miss America's Outstanding Teen 2008 title in 2007
Catherine Brunell (born 1975), Broadway actress from Shrewsbury, Massachusetts
David Brunell (born 1954), American pianist
Johan Brunell, Finnish footballer
Mark Brunell (born 1970), American football quarterback
Mia Brunell Livfors (born 1965), Swedish businesswoman
Ole Brunell or Shlomo Brunell, (born 1953), Lutheran minister who converted to Judaism

See also
Brumel
Brunaille
Brunei
Brunelle
Brunelles
Burnell
Brunel (disambiguation)
Bruneau (disambiguation)